The 2019 Meitar Open was a professional tennis tournament played on outdoor hard courts. It was the first edition of the tournament which was part of the 2019 ITF Women's World Tennis Tour. It took place in Meitar, Israel between 9 and 15 September 2019.

Singles main-draw entrants

Seeds

 1 Rankings are as of 26 August 2019.

Other entrants
The following players received wildcards into the singles main draw:
  Shelly Bereznyak
  Ilona Georgiana Ghioroaie
  Shavit Kimchi
  Maya Tahan

The following players received entry from the qualifying draw:
  Alicia Barnett
  Lina Glushko
  Nadiia Kichenok
  Anna Kubareva
  Viktória Morvayová
  Victoria Muntean

Champions

Singles

 Clara Tauson def.  Katharina Hobgarski, 4–6, 6–3, 6–1

Doubles

 Sofya Lansere /  Kamilla Rakhimova def.  Anastasia Gasanova /  Valeriya Strakhova, 4–6, 6–4, [10–3]

References

External links
 2019 Meitar Open at ITFtennis.com

2019 ITF Women's World Tennis Tour
2019 in Israeli sport
Tennis tournaments in Israel